Samuel Demeritt Felker (April 16, 1859November 14, 1932) was an American lawyer and Democratic politician from Rochester, New Hampshire.

Family life
Felker was born to William H. and Deborah A. (Demeritt) Felker in Rochester, New Hampshire.  Felker married Mary J. Dudley on June 26, 1900 in Buffalo, New York.  Felker was a member of the Congregationalist Church.

Education
Felker graduated from Dartmouth College in 1882.  In 1888 Felker earned a A.M. and a L.L.B from the Boston University School of Law.

Early political career
Felker was a member of the New Hampshire state constitutional convention of 1889, he served in the New Hampshire Senate from 1890 to 1892, as the mayor of Rochester, New Hampshire in 1896 and 1897, and from 1909 to 1911 in the New Hampshire House of Representatives.

Governor of New Hampshire
In 1912 Felker ran as a Democrat for governor of New Hampshire, because no candidate received a majority of the vote, Felker was selected governor by the New Hampshire legislature.  Felker did not seek reelection in 1914, and after deliberating, decided against a bid for the state's U.S. Senate seat.

Judge of the Rochester Municipal Court
Felker's gubernatorial successor, Rolland H. Spaulding, appointed Felker as Judge of the Rochester Municipal Court, a position Felker held from July 20, 1915  until 1930.

Death
Felker died at his home in Rochester on November 14, 1932.

Notes

External links
Felker at New Hampshire's Division of Historic Resources

1859 births
1932 deaths
Democratic Party governors of New Hampshire
People from Rochester, New Hampshire
Democratic Party members of the New Hampshire House of Representatives
Democratic Party New Hampshire state senators
Dartmouth College alumni
Boston University School of Law alumni